Sofía Bozán (5 November 1904 – 9 July 1958) was an Argentine film actress and tango performer of the 1930s and 1940s. She made almost 30 appearances in film between 1937 and 1959.

She began her career in acting in 1931 and appeared in films such as Puerto nuevo in 1936 and Loco lindo (1937) and Muchachas que estudian in 1939.

She also appeared in the tango film Arriba el telón o el patio de la morocha in 1951 as herself.

She was the sister of Elena Bozán.  Sofia Bozán died of cancer only aged 53 in 1958.

Filmography

La Calle del pecado (1954)
Campeón à la fuerza (1950)
Rodríguez, supernumerario (1948)
Elvira Fernández, vendedora de tiendas (1942)
Isabelita (1940) .... Elena
Carnaval de antaño (1940)
Los Muchachos se divierten (1940)
Muchachas que estudian (1939) .... Luisa
Loco lindo (1937)
 Puerto nuevo     (1936)
Goal (1936)
 The Lights of Buenos Aires (1931) .... Elvira del Solar

External links

 

1904 births
1958 deaths
Actresses from Buenos Aires
Argentine film actresses
Deaths from cancer in Argentina
Tango film actresses
Tango singers
Burials at La Chacarita Cemetery
20th-century Argentine actresses
20th-century Argentine women singers